Qumarlêb County is a county in the northeast of the Yushu Tibetan Autonomous Prefecture, south-central Qinghai province, China.

Geography and climate

Average low temperatures are below freezing from mid September to late May; however, due to the wide diurnal temperature variation, average highs are only below freezing from mid/late November until early March. Despite frequent rain during summer, when a majority of days sees rain, no month has less than 50 percent of possible sunshine; with monthly percent possible sunshine ranging from 51 percent in June to 78 percent in November, the county seat receives 2,782 hours of bright sunshine annually.

Administrative divisions
Qumarlêb County (Qumalai County) is divided to 1 towns and 5 townships.
Towns
 Yuegai

Townships

References

External links

County-level divisions of Qinghai
Yushu Tibetan Autonomous Prefecture